The Cashel Extension Railway, or the Cashel Spur Line, was an old line connecting Cashel to the Dublin-Cork railway. It opened in 1904, with passenger and later freight services running until its closure in 1954.

References

Closed railways in Ireland
Transport in County Tipperary